The Fiscal Information and Investigation Service ( (FIOD)) is an agency of the government of the Netherlands responsible for investigating financial crimes. It is part of the Tax and Customs Administration, which itself falls under the responsibility of the Dutch  Ministry of Finance.

History 
The FIOD-ECD was formed when the FIOD and the ECD were merged in 1999.
In 2010, the name was changed to FIOD.

Role 
The FIOD's main roles are in investigation and governance. Investigations are mainly carried out into economic, fiscal and financial fraud. Governance is carried out in economic and financial areas.

Any one of the five main Dutch ministries (Economics, Finance, Foreign Affairs, Justice, and Health, Welfare and Sports) can order the FIOD to act on information of suspected fraud. They are also the investigational unit for several financial watchdogs.

Piracy 
One of the investigative teams is the Team Opsporing Piraterij (Piracy Investigations Team) which specifically investigates breaches of the Copyright Act of 1912.

It has cooperated with BREIN to investigate p2p sites hosted in the Netherlands.

References 

Dutch intelligence agencies